Bandos (1964 – September 1987) was a gray Arabian stallion with Crabbet ancestry. He was sired by Negatiw, a Tersk bred stud, out of Bandola, who was known by the title of "Queen of Poland". Bandos was a sire in Poland for 11 years, and in 1982, he was imported to the United States.

Life and career
Bandos was foaled at Poland's Janow Podlaski Stud in 1964. He was sired by Negatiw, who was by the Skowronek son, Naseem, and out of the Polish-bred mare, Bandola. His dam was a full sister to Bask, a sire of significance.  Bandos himself, at a young age, was nicknamed the "King of Janow". Bandos was considered to be one of the most influential Saglawi-type stallions. Those who knew him described him as, "Very pleasant and quiet in the stall, however, when brought out, full of fire and very animated." Bandos stood as a Janow Podlaski stud for seven years, moved to Michalow Stud for another two years, then Kurosweki Stud for another year. For the 1981 breeding season he was returned to Janow.

In September 1982, Bandos was sold for $806,000 to Ventura Farms of California during the Polish Prestige Sale at Janow Podlaski Stud. He was imported to the United States by truck and plane and spent the rest of his life there until his death in September 1987.

Offspring and legacy
Bandos sired 129 foals during his years in Poland, many of which went on to become champions themselves.
They were sold over a three-year period at the Polish Prestige Sales for an average price of $49,000. He went on to sire three Derby winners and ten Polish National Champions. One of his most notable offspring was Eukaliptus, whose dam was Eunice, the daughter of Comet.

Pedigree
Naseem, Bandos's grandsire, was a Skowronek son who in 1936 was sold to Russia by Lady Wentworth of the Crabbet Arabian Stud. A few of Bandos's ancestors, including Enwer Bay and Gazella II, were requisitioned by the Russian Army during World War II. Also during World War II, Bandos's grandsire, Ofir, was among some of the horses taken during the Soviet invasion of Poland. Ofir was of the desert-bred stallion Kuhailan-Haifi who was foaled in 1923. Kuhailan-Haifi was imported from the Jauf region of the Arabian Peninsula by Prince Roman Sanguszko of the Gumniska Stud.

Notes

References 

Individual male horses
1978 racehorse deaths
1964 racehorse births